Séduisant was a  74-gun ship of the line of the French Navy, lead ship of  her class.

She was renamed Pelletier on 30 September 1793, in honour of Louis Michel le Peletier de Saint-Fargeau. Under Savary, she was one of the last ships of the line at the Glorious First of June.

On 30 May 1795 her name was changed back to Séduisant. She sank accidentally on 16 December 1796 while leaving Brest for the Expédition d'Irlande. Out of 600 crew and 610 soldiers, only 60 survived. Other sources speak of 650–680 survivors.
The wreck was rediscovered in 1986.

Notes

References

 Guerre sur mer pendant la révolution et l'empire. Episode XXXII. 
Demerliac, Cmdt. Alain, Nomenclature des navires français de 1774 a 1792.  Editions ANCRE, Nice.
Winfield, Rif and Roberts, Stephen (2015) French Warships in the Age of Sail 1786-1861: Design, Construction, Careers and Fates. Seaforth Publishing. .

Ships of the line of the French Navy
Séduisant-class ships of the line
Shipwrecks in the Bay of Biscay
1783 ships
Maritime incidents in 1796